Elizabeth Millioud (born 1939) is a Mexican painter and sculptor.

Born in Mexico City, Millioud received some instruction in ceramics and mosaic work, but was largely self-taught. In 1963 she held her first solo exhibition, at the Mexican-North American Institute of Cultural Relations in Mexico City. Her work has since appeared in many exhibitions both in Mexico and abroad.

References

1939 births
Living people
Mexican women painters
Mexican women sculptors
20th-century Mexican painters
20th-century Mexican sculptors
20th-century Mexican women artists
21st-century Mexican painters
21st-century Mexican sculptors
21st-century Mexican women artists
Artists from Mexico City